Silvia Farina Elia was the defending champion, but lost in the semifinals to Lindsay Davenport. Claudine Schaul won her first WTA singles title, defeating Davenport in the final 2–6, 6–0, 6–3. 

It was Schaul's only singles title on the WTA tour.

Seeds

Draw

Finals

Top half

Bottom half

References

External links
Draws (ITF) 

2004 Internationaux de Strasbourg Singles
2004 WTA Tour
2004 in French tennis